Titus Annius Luscus was the name of several ancient Roman men of the plebeian gens Annia, including:
Titus Annius Luscus, one of three envoys sent with Roman demands to Perseus of Macedon in 172 BC
 Titus Annius Luscus, consul in 153 BC, and one of the enemies of Tiberius Gracchus
 Titus Annius Rufus, perhaps also with the additional cognomen Luscus, consul in 128 BC

Annii
Ancient Roman prosopographical lists